Wilfred Brown (21 March 1930 – 25 April 2015) was an Australian cricketer. He played two first-class matches for Queensland in 1952/53.

References

External links
 

1930 births
2015 deaths
Australian cricketers
Queensland cricketers
People from Warwick, Queensland
Sportsmen from Queensland